Carcha hersilialis is a species of snout moth in the genus Carcha. It was described by Francis Walker in 1859, and is known from the Dominican Republic and Puerto Rico, as well as the greater and lesser Antilles.

References

Moths described in 1859
Chrysauginae